Allium rubens, the reddish onion, is a species of onions native to Siberia, European Russia, Mongolia, Kazakhstan and Xinjiang. It grows in sunlit locations on steppes and scrublands.

Allium rubens produces clusters of small, narrow bulbs up to 10 mm in diameter. Scape is up to 25 cm tall. Leaves are tubular, about the same length as the scape, 10–20 mm in diameter. Umbels have only a few reddish-purple flowers.

References

rubens
Flora of Central Asia
Flora of Xinjiang
Flora of Siberia
Flora of Mongolia
Onions
Plants described in 1809
Taxa named by Carl Ludwig Willdenow